Stanford Main No. 2 Colliery, also known as Paxton Colliery, was a coal mine located at Paxton, New South Wales, Australia. The mine was named Stanford Merthyr No. 2 until 1 May 1931. The mine was started in the 1920s, by the East Greta Coal Mining Company. The Greta coal seam has been mined using bord and pillar mining methods. Coal was transported from the mine via the Paxton Branch of the South Maitland Railway.

1905 Mine Disaster 
The disaster occurred on Sunday 29 October 1905. No one was working underground at the time of the disaster.

Rumours started to circulated that fire was the work of an arsonist.·The mine manager offered  a £300  reward for information  leading to  a conviction  for  arson.  A labourer called Charles Libeck was arrested and charged with arson and  the case was dropped due to insufficient evidence. Reports of a man lurking near colliery two hours before the fire

Work at  the  colliery had  ceased  at midday  on  Saturday 28  October and  the men  and boys  had left  the  mine.· On Saturday  afternoon  only a  few  deputies and shift  men engaged  in maintenance were  working  underground and  they  had left  by 3pm.·  William Robert Fenn, engine driver and watchman was on duty at the surface on his Saturday  11pm  to Sunday  7am  shift when at  1.45am  he became  aware  the electric warning bells were  ringing.· He did  nothing  immediately and  returned  to the  engine room with the bells still ringing as he assumed that no one was underground.·  Fenn admitted at the  inquest  that he  thought someone on  the  surface  was playing  a  trick on him.· It was not until a few hours later when he noticed smoke emitting from the tunnels and realised that  the mine  was  on fire that  he raised  the alarm.· Joined by a group of deputies , mine manager Henry Morgan  William and under manager William Williams.

The fire continued to burn from 5am to 8am. Finding a great volume of black smoke emitting from both tunnels  they decided to seal off portions of the workings and create an airtight barrier.·  Cartloads of soil and clay were deposited and a crew of bricklayers started constructing a temporary brick stopping in the main tunnel.·

Approximately 11:30 the first explosion occurred.·Twenty officials received the full stock of the explosion. The second explosion occurred at 2pm.· House from half a mile away felt the explosion and was described as a earthquake.· Explosions occurred when filling tunnels and ventilating the shaft with debris to keep flumes down The explosion occurred to due to the main tunnel being blocked by dirt.  All   deaths occurred in the second explosion.

Volunteers together with  members  of the  Kurri  Kurri Fire  Brigade  and local police  officers  assisted in  the  task of  rescue  and  recovery  of the  injured  and deceased.· Doctors were summoned  and  a special  train  ordered to  transport  the injured  to  West Maitland hospital.

Some claimed that it was due to 'spontaneous combustion' whilst others argued that a lighted lamp had been left in the tunnel after work ceased.·Another cause canvassed was that a shot  that had  failed  to  fire  had exploded  after  workmen. Other believed the cause by conglomerate and coal catching alight

Scottish type open oil lamps, attached to miner's caps, were used throughout the mine. Safety lamps  were  only used  during  the inspections  made  by  mine  deputies.

The disaster made up 31.6% of the death recorded on coal and shale mines in New South Wales. 5 of 6 deaths were Welsh immigrants.

In 1905 the mine produced 630,054 tons of coal and 369 men and boys with 206 of them working underground. Pit horses were used underground and brought to the surface each day The colliery  had  the reputation  of  producing superior  quality  coal suitable for  gas, steam making and for household purpose. The mine was owned by the East Greta Coal Mining Company.

Coronial Inquest was held on 31 October at Kurri Kurri Courthouse.·27 people gave evidence and were cross examined by the jury.·Verdict was handed down on 10 August  that explosion occurred due to gas distilled or generated from fire in the mine coming in contract with flame.·   No evidence to show how the fire  originated but caused the limited use of naked flames.

Following a service at the Congregational church, the cortege was led  by the newly formed local brass band proceeded to the Kurri Kurri cemetery.·        The deceased were interred in a mass grave after a combined religious service at the graveside.· A marble monument, funded by the local community was erected over the site. It bore the following epitaph in  both English  and  Welsh

Tuesday 26 June 1906 the mining reopened All injuries made a full recovery. All machinery was intact with only the fans being damaged. The disaster left 415 men and boys with disaster affecting about 1000 people.

List of Deaths:

 Henry J Adams Director
 John Evans mine deputy
 James Greener deputy
 David Jones shiftman
 John W Jones shiftman

List of Injuries

 O. K Young merchant fractured skull and leg
 Will Williams undermanager , serious injuries to hand and foot
 Henry Thomas manager injuries to head and body
 George Fewin died next day both legs broken  burns about the face , hands , head and arms
 Walter Jones , deputy manager broken arm legs , and dislocated ankles
 George Leitch  deputy manager arm amputated
 Colin M’Kenzie bricklayer thigh broken
 Evan Evans deputy , jaw broken in three places , injury to eye , scalp wounds and burns generally

References

Stanford Main No. 2 Colliery

Coal mines in New South Wales
Mines in New South Wales
City of Cessnock